Ethan Ruby is the president and CEO of Theraplant, a company that produces and processes legal medical marijuana in Connecticut, and is president of the Connecticut Medical Cannabis Council. He became involved in debates over medical marijuana in part because, after a traffic accident left him a paraplegic, he has given testimony about the benefits he has received from his use of cannabis for control of severe pain.

Background

Ruby was a star baseball player at Moses Brown School in Providence, Rhode Island, and played college baseball at Brandeis University and the University of Pennsylvania, where he played left field briefly with future major leaguer Mark DeRosa on the 1995-96 Ivy League championship team. He graduated from Penn in 1997 with a degree in psychology.

On November 29, 2000, while crossing a street in New York City, Ruby was struck by a driver who ran a red light and hit another car which then struck him, severing a vertebra and leaving him with no movement below his middle chest and persistent pain in his legs. Ruby subsequently sued Budget Rent a Car with a jury awarding him $24.5 million, finding that the rental car company was liable under New York’s vicarious liability law, which stated that a rental car or leasing agency could be held responsible for a driver’s negligence. The two sides settled for $20 million in
2005. The case between Ruby and the rental car company has since been cited during debate over the constitutionality of vicarious liability
laws.

Medical marijuana

Ruby founded Theraplant as part of an effort to open a licensed medical marijuana production facility in Connecticut after that state legalized the medicine in 2012.

In September 2014, Theraplant became the first company in Connecticut to produce medical marijuana. It is currently operating in Watertown, Connecticut, and its products are available at various dispensaries throughout the state.
Ruby has also joined efforts to open similar licensed facilities in Minnesota and other states.

References

Brandeis University alumni
University of Pennsylvania alumni
American chief executives
Living people
Moses Brown School alumni
Year of birth missing (living people)